The following terms are used by electrical engineers in statistical signal processing studies instead of typical statistician's terms.

In other engineering fields, particularly mechanical engineering, uncertainty analysis examines systematic and random components of variations in measurements associated with physical experiments.

Notes

References 
 S.M. Kay, Fundamentals of Statistical Signal Processing, .
 H. Coleman and W. G. Steele, Experimentation and uncertainty analysis for engineers, .

Detection theory
Statistical hypothesis testing